Pierre H. Vincent,  (born April 2, 1955 in Trois-Rivières, Quebec) is a Canadian tax lawyer and former  politician.

Member of Parliament

Vincent was first elected to the House of Commons of Canada in the 1984 electoral landslide that brought Brian Mulroney and the Progressive Conservative Party to power. Vincent, the PC Member of Parliament for Trois-Rivières served as Parliamentary Secretary to the Minister of National Revenue from 1984 until 1985; Parliamentary Secretary to the Minister of Finance from 1985 to 1993, and was also Parliamentary Secretary to the Deputy Prime Minister of Canada from 1991 to 1993.

Cabinet member

In January 1993, Vincent was elevated to Prime Minister Mulroney's Cabinet as Minister of State for  Indian Affairs and Northern Development and Minister of Consumer and Corporate Affairs. When Kim Campbell succeeded Mulroney as PC leader and prime minister, she promoted Vincent to Minister of the Environment. His appointment was criticized as the appointment of a relative neophyte to the position was seen as a message by Campbell that the Environment was no longer considered a senior portfolio.

He was sworn of the Privy Council on January 5, 1993.

Both Vincent and the Campbell government were defeated in the 1993 federal election and Vincent returned to private life.

Return in politics

Both Vincent and former colleague Suzanne Duplessis managed the Conservative campaign in Quebec in the 2008 federal election.

Footnotes

External links
 

1955 births
Living people
Members of the House of Commons of Canada from Quebec
Progressive Conservative Party of Canada MPs
Lawyers in Quebec
Members of the King's Privy Council for Canada
People from Trois-Rivières
Members of the 24th Canadian Ministry
Members of the 25th Canadian Ministry